Livin' or Dyin' is the third studio album by country music artist Jack Ingram, released on March 25, 1997. It was the only album of his career released via Rising Tide Records due to that label closing soon after its release. The first two singles of Ingram's career were released from this album, "That's Not Me" and "Flutter". They both charted poorly with "Flutter" peaking at No. 51 while the other failed to chart altogether in the United States.

Content
Livin' or Dyin''' was produced by country artists Steve Earle and Ray Kennedy, credited on the album as the Twang Trust. Of the 14 songs on the album, 9 were written or co-written by Ingram. The last track, "Airways Motel" was written with Portland, Oregon based Alt-country artist Todd Snider, who also plays acoustic guitar on the track.

"Dallas" was originally recorded by Jimmie Dale Gilmore in 1989 on his self-titled album. "Rita Ballou" first appeared on Guy Clark's 1975 debut album, Old No. 1. "Imitation of love" was originally recorded by George Jones in 1966. Ingram had previously recorded a more stripped-down version of "Flutter" on his 1995 eponymous debut album. "Dim Lights, Thick Smoke" is a cover of Vern Gosdin from his 1985 album Time Stood Still''.

Track listing

Personnel
Taken from liner notes.

The Beat Up Ford Band
Chris Claridy - electric guitar, background vocals
Pete Coatney - drums, percussion
Jack Ingram - lead and background vocals, acoustic guitar
Gus Salmon - bass guitar, 6 string trem bass, background vocals

Other musicians
Pat Earle - china crash
Steve Earle - harmony vocals, acoustic guitar, high string guitar, nylon acoustic guitar, acoustic archtop guitar, harmonium
Tommy Hannum - steel guitar, dobro, tremolo steel guitar, lap steel guitar
Ray Kennedy - Hammond organ, tambourine, piano, 6-string punk bass
Tom Littlefield - background vocals
T. Money - needle drops, surface noise
Michael Smotherman - Hammond organ
Todd Snider - acoustic guitar
Jerry Jeff Walker - acoustic guitar, harmonica

Chart performance

Singles

References

1997 albums
Jack Ingram albums
Rising Tide Records albums